Mutiara Rini is a suburb in Iskandar Puteri, Johor Bahru District, Johor, Malaysia. It is owned by Mutiara Rini Sdn Bhd. a member of the Boustead Group. This township was founded in 1996. Before 1996 it was called Rini Estate. Rini Estate had a lot of oil palms. After 1996, it was called Mutiara Rini. Mutiara Rini had 10,000 houses. It is located within the western corridor of Johor Bahru which is 13 km northwest from Johor Bahru City Centre and is easily accessible by way of Skudai Highway about 2 km away from the east.

Schools in Mutiara Rini
SJK(C) Thorburn
SMK Taman Mutiara Rini
SMK Taman Mutiara Rini 2
SK Taman Mutiara Rini 2
SK Taman Mutiara Rini
SJK(T) Rini

Transportation
The area is accessible by Muafakat Bus route P-202.

See also 
Mutiara Damansara
Pulai Mutiara, Johor

References

Iskandar Puteri
Townships in Johor